Overture Networks was a company that designed, manufactured, and marketed networking and telecommunications equipment. It was "a leading developer of converged packet access platforms for Carrier Ethernet services." Overture was headquartered in Research Triangle Park (RTP), North Carolina and also maintained offices in Westford, MA and Bangalore, India.

Overture was a member of the Metro Ethernet Forum (MEF). It also held a TL 9000 certification which it received from the QuEST Forum in May 2007.

In January 2016, Overture was acquired by telecommunications vendor ADVA Optical Networking.

History
In 2000, Overture was launched by co-founders Jeff Reedy and Prayson Pate to develop solutions designed to help service providers and network operators transition to an all-packet network. In December 2008, Overture Networks acquired Ceterus Networks, a Richardson, Texas-based manufacturer of Carrier Ethernet equipment and technologies for mobile backhaul. In March 2011, Overture merged with Hatteras Networks, the number one-ranked Ethernet over Copper market leader and manufacturer of Ethernet service delivery solutions for the Carrier Ethernet, Metro Ethernet, and DSLAM and mobile wireless backhaul markets. Post-merger, the unified company operated under the Overture Networks name until February 2012, when a rebranding initiative was announced. Marking the final integration of the two companies, Overture introduced a new logo, color palette, company blog, and tagline, "Overture - An Entrance to a Smarter Network", and informally dropped "Networks" from its name.

Beginning in 2008, and continuing through 2009, 2010, and 2011, Overture was named as the number one provider of Ethernet over TDM (EoTDM) access circuits and Ethernet over bonded copper pair (EoC) platforms by analyst firm Heavy Reading.

In September 2012, Overture appointed former Ciena Corporation Senior VP of Global Field Operations, General Manager of Global Government Solutions, and VP of Americas, Mike Aquino, as its new President and Chief Executive Officer (CEO).

Overture announced the company's entry into the Software-Defined Networking (SDN) space in March 2012 with the launch of a new product, Ensemble OSA. Ensemble OSA is an open architecture based on open API standards like OpenFlow and has three layers, which may include Overture-developed components, as well as those developed by service providers or third-party vendors. Overture followed this with the release of the Overture 6500, the first Ensemble OSA-ready platform and the inaugural product in its Open Service Delivery Family product line.

In January 2016, Overture was acquired by ADVA Optical Networking in a $35 million purchase which was reported to involve "an additional $5 million conditional 'earn-out' payment".

Current products and applications
Overture's products were generally used in the following solution categories: business services, mobile backhaul, Ethernet transport and infrastructure for speeds from 1 Mbit/s to 10 Gbit/s, and SDN. The company's products addressed these core applications using a range of access technologies including optical Ethernet, Ethernet over bonded copper, Ethernet over TDM/SONET/SDH/PDH, and multi-service Carrier Ethernet that supported TDM pseudo-wires and IP service aggregation using VLANs. Targeted to users such as competitive local exchange carriers, incumbent local exchange carriers, cable companies, and wholesale ISPs, its technologies were used in applications and settings like cloud computing, data center services, and mobile data services. Overture Network's products achieved MEF 9, 14, and 18 certifications.

Ethernet over bonded copper
 Overture LPM 8
 Overture 239
 Overture 400
 Overture 4000

Ethernet over TDM, SONET, SDH, and PDH

 Overture 34
 Overture 45 and 45+
 Overture 140
 Overture 180
 Overture 500

Mobile Backhaul
 Overture 600
 Overture 400
 Overture 65
 Overture 6500

Optical Ethernet

 Overture 65
 Overture 6500
 Overture 1400
 Overture 4800
 Overture 6000
 Overture 6100

Software-Defined Services
 Ensemble OSA
 Overture 6500

Customers and partners
Overture serviced more than 450 service providers and network operators in 45 countries worldwide. Among the company's major customers were BellSouth (now AT&T), Cavalier Telephone,
COLT, Internode, Integra Telecom, IPC Systems, MASERGY, One Connect Limited, Optivon, PAETEC, THUS, tw telecom, Verizon Business, Veroxity, Windstream Communications, and XO Communications.

The company also established and maintained a network of distributor and reseller, OEM,  service and support, system integrator, and technology alliance partners. Among its partners were Alcatel-Lucent, ADVA Optical Networking, Cyan, Telent, and Walker and Associates.

Awards and recognition
Corporate, product, and personnel awards won by Overture include the following:

2007
Frost & Sullivan Carrier Ethernet Entrepreneurial Company of the Year

2008
Triangle Business Journal Fast 50
Business Leader Magazine 2008 Impact Entrepreneurs
Internet Telephony Excellence Award
Internet Telephony Product of the Year
Red Herring 100 North America

2009
4GWE Product of the Year
4G Wireless Evolution Wireless Backhaul Distinction Award
Ethernet Expo Americas Awards - Best Carrier Ethernet Solution
InfoVision Awards - Access Network Technologies and Services
Internet Telephony Product of the Year Award
Red Herring Global 100
Supercomm Eos Awards - Technology Innovation, Access Networking

2010
4G Wireless Evolution Wireless Backhaul Distinction Award
IT Product of the Year
 TMC Communications Solutions Product of the Year Award
TMC Labs Innovation Awards

2011
American Business Awards - Stevie Awards, Business-to-Business Marketing Campaign of the Year Finalist
Business Leader Magazine Top 50 Entrepreneurs
NGN Leadership Award
Triangle Business Journal CFO of the Year - Large Private Company

2012
American Business Awards - Stevie Awards, People's Choice Stevie® Awards, Favorite New Products
American Business Awards - Stevie Awards, Silver Medalist, Best New Product or Service - Telecommunications
Business Leader Magazine Top Entrepreneurs 
Ernst & Young Entrepreneur Of The Year Finalist
Global Telecom Innovation Business Awards - Ethernet Performance Innovation 
Internet Telephony Excellence Award
Internet Telephony NGN Leadership Awards
Triangle Business Journal Fast 50 - #1 Fastest Growing Company

References

External links
 
 Overtones Blog: https://web.archive.org/web/20151210181826/http://www.overturenetworks.com/connect-with-overture/overtones-blog/

Telecommunications companies established in 2000
Privately held companies based in North Carolina
Telecommunications companies of the United States
Telecommunications equipment vendors
Networking companies of the United States
Networking hardware companies
Research Triangle
American companies established in 2000